The Garden Spot Programs, 1950 is a compilation of four fifteen-minute radio shows recorded by country music singer Hank Williams for Naughton Farms in February 1950.

After discs containing four shows were found in 2013 by a record collector, the 24 tracks were remastered and released by Omnivore Recordings. The release won a Grammy Award for Best Historical Album.

Content
In February 1950, Hank Williams recorded a series of fifteen-minute radio shows, commissioned by Naughton Farms, a plant nursery out of Waxahachie, Texas. Instead of the Drifting Cowboys, Williams was backed by a band assembled for the job. The sixteen-inch transcription discs were sent to radio stations across the United States to be broadcast along with commercials for the nursery.

In 2013, recordings of four of the shows were found by record collector George Gimarc at KSIB-AM in Creston, Iowa. Girmac notified Williams biographer Colin Escott and together they contacted Cheryl Pawelski, founder of the reissue label Omnivore Recordings. Escott and Pawelski met with William's daughter, Jett Williams, who cleared the release. For the re-master and restoration of the tracks, Omnivore hired audio engineer Michael Graves.

Release and reception

The 24-track album was released by Omnivore on May 20, 2014, on CD and digital LP. The liner notes of the album were written by Escott, while the packaging included pictures from the author's personal collection. The release won Best Historical Album during the 57th Grammy Awards.

Allmusic rated the release with four stars out of five. The reviewer noted that while the band that backed Williams did not complement him as did his usual band, the singer "sounds strong and inspired". PopMatters rated it with eight points out of ten, qualifying the performances as "more than polished and heartfelt ... downright chilling."

Track listing

Chart performance

Footnotes

References

2014 compilation albums
Grammy Award for Best Historical Album
Compilation albums published posthumously
Hank Williams albums
Omnivore Recordings albums